ASMA can stand for:
Antarctic Specially Managed Area
Anti-smooth muscle antibody
Actin, alpha 1
Atari SAP Music Archive
Aerospace Medical Association

See also
Asma (disambiguation)